Piano Concerto No. 2 in F major, Op. 102, by Dmitri Shostakovich was composed in 1957 for the 19th birthday of his son Maxim, who premiered the piece during his graduation concert at the Moscow Conservatory. It contains many similar elements to Shostakovich's Concertino for Two Pianos: both works were written to be accessible for developing young pianists. It is an uncharacteristically cheerful piece, much more so than most of Shostakovich's works.

Instrumentation 
The work is scored for solo piano, two flutes, piccolo, two oboes, two clarinets, two bassoons, four horns, timpani, snare drum and strings.

Movements 
The concerto lasts around 20 minutes and has three movements, with the second movement played attacca, thereby moving directly into the third:

Reception 
In a letter to Edison Denisov in mid-February 1957, barely a week after he had finished work on it, the composer himself wrote that the work had "no redeeming artistic merits". It has been suggested that Shostakovich wanted to pre-empt criticism by deprecating the work himself (having been the victim of official censure numerous times), and that the comment was actually meant to be tongue-in-cheek. In April 1957, he and his son performed a two piano arrangement of the work for the Ministry of Culture, and then it was later premiered for the public at the Moscow Conservatory.

Despite the apparently simple nature of this concerto, the public has always regarded it warmly, and it stands as one of Shostakovich's most popular pieces. In 2017, the concerto was voted 19th in the Classic FM Hall of Fame.

Recordings 
Despite his dismissal of the concerto, the composer performed it himself on a number of occasions, and recorded it along with his first concerto. Both are played at fast tempo rarely matched in modern recordings. On the third recording, one can hear some of the passages played by Shostakovich were not as clean and it was a sign of his deteriorating hand. In his recordings of the second movement, Shostakovich presents slight variations in some passages that are not written in the score. Some examples include a repeated chord Shostakovich plays from bar 33 that is from the first beat of bar 34 is written as a tie in the score.

Maxim's own son, Dmitri Maximovich Shostakovich, also recorded the piece, with his father conducting I Musici de Montreal. Dmitri the younger approaches his grandfather's tempi and phrasing.

Other recordings include those by Leonard Bernstein as soloist and conductor for Columbia Records, Marc-André Hamelin for Hyperion Records, and Dmitri Alexeev with Jerzy Maksymiuk conducting the English Chamber Orchestra.  There has been a recording of this concerto by the Mariinsky Orchestra with soloist, Denis Matsuev and Valery Gergiev as conductor.

In Fantasia 2000, Yefim Bronfman plays the concerto's first movement (Allegro) as the story teller of "The Steadfast Tin Soldier" by Hans Christian Andersen. Bronfman has also recorded both of the concertos with the Los Angeles Philharmonic orchestra conducted by Esa-Pekka Salonen.

Ballet
The concerto is used in two different ballets. Kenneth MacMillan's Concerto premiered in on 30 November 1966 at the Deutsche Oper Berlin, then became a Royal Ballet repertoire. Alexei Ratmansky created Concerto DSCH for the New York City Ballet, and premiered in 2008.

References

Sources
 
 

Concertos by Dmitri Shostakovich
Shostakovich 2
1957 compositions
Compositions in F major